Dukhan Iyali is a village in Dhar Kalan in Gurdaspur district of Punjab State, India. The village is administrated by Sarpanch an elected representative of the village.

Demography 
, The village has a total number of 126 houses and the population of 664 of which 332 are males while 332 are females according to the report published by Census India in 2011. The literacy rate of the village is 77.84%, highest than the state average of 75.84%. The population of children under the age of 6 years is 100 which is 15.06% of total population of the village, and child sex ratio is approximately 724 lower than the state average of 846.

Most of the people are from Schedule Caste which constitutes 21.84% of total population in the village. The town does not have any Schedule Tribe population so far.

As per census 2011, 178 people were engaged in work activities out of the total population of the village which includes 161 males and 17 females. According to census survey report 2011, 96.63% workers describe their work as main work and 3.73% workers are involved in marginal activity providing the livelihood for less than 6 months.

Transport 

See also
List of villages in India

References 

Villages in Gurdaspur district